Dennis Rinsler is an American television producer and writer. He is best known for work on the series Full House, Even Stevens and That's So Raven. All of which worked with fellow producer and writer Marc Warren.

Career
Rinsler was studying to be a teacher at New York State University in New Paltz when he met Marc Warren. Their 11 years of experiences as New York City teachers was the inspiration for the 1990s sitcom Nick Freno: Licensed Teacher starring Mitch Mullany, which they created and were executive producers of.

They have been active since 1982, writing and producing for the television series Madame's Place, Fast Times, Full House (which they also executive produced and served as showrunners of for the series' final three seasons), The Parent 'Hood and served as creators of Cory in the House. The two have been nominated for Daytime and Primetime Emmys for their work on the Disney Channel series Even Stevens and That's So Raven.
They also won N.A.A.C.P. Image awards for Outstanding Children's Program (That's So Raven) two years in a row.

In 2009, Rinsler and Warren  dissolved their partnership (though the two had each been writing and directing solo during their runs as executive producers of Even Stevens (Rinsler directing the episodes "Gutter Queen" and "Beans on the Brain"), That's So Raven (Warren directing five episodes) and Cory in the House (Warren directing two episodes), while retaining a producer partnership), with Warren eventually getting a solo job as a writer and consulting producer of Jonas for its second and last season in 2010.

References

External links

American television producers
American television writers
American male television writers
Living people
Place of birth missing (living people)
Year of birth missing (living people)